The 1995 Eurocard Open was a men's ATP tennis tournament played on indoor carpet courts at the Hanns-Martin-Schleyer-Halle in Stuttgart, Germany that was part of the Championship Series of the 1995 ATP Tour. It was the sixth edition of the tournament and was held from 20 February until 26 February 1995. Unseeded Richard Krajicek won the singles title.

Finals

Singles
 Richard Krajicek defeated  Michael Stich 7–6(7–4), 6–3, 6–7(6–8), 1–6, 6–3
 It was Krajicek's 1st singles title of the year and 8th of his career.

Doubles
 Grant Connell /  Patrick Galbraith defeated  Cyril Suk /  Daniel Vacek 6–2, 6–2

References

External links
 ITF tournament edition details

Eurocard Open
Eurocard Open